Group C of the 2000 Fed Cup World Group was one of three pools in the World Group of the 2000 Fed Cup. Four teams competed in a round robin competition, with the top team advancing to the knockout stage.

Belgium vs. Australia

France vs. Russia

France vs. Australia

Belgium vs. France

Russia vs. Australia

Belgium vs. Russia

See also
Fed Cup structure

References

External links
 Fed Cup website

2000 Fed Cup World Group